Lábatlan is a town in Komárom-Esztergom county, Hungary.

External links

  in Hungarian
 Street map 

Populated places in Komárom-Esztergom County